Hellinsia thoracica is a moth of the family Pterophoridae. It is found in North America, including Arizona.

The wingspan is 18–20 mm. The forewings are light ochreous, shaded with pale brownish in the costal half of the wing, including the first lobe. Below this darker shading a strong suffusion of blackish scaling is found extending from the base of the wing to the cleft. The hindwings are smoky brown with paler fringes.

References

Moths described in 1939
thoracica
Moths of North America
Taxa named by James Halliday McDunnough